Rashad Smith (born April 20, 1997) is an American football linebacker for the Birmingham Stallions of the United States Football League (USFL). He played college football at Florida Atlantic.

Early years
Smith attended Homestead High School. As a junior, he had 6 fumble recoveries. As a senior, he appeared in 10 games, tallying 102 tackles, 8 sacks and 3 forced fumbles.

College career
Smith accepted a football scholarship from the Florida Atlantic University. As a true freshman, he appeared in 11 games, compiling 22 tackles (2 for loss) and one sack. He had 5 solo tackles against Kansas State University. He started against the University of North Carolina at Charlotte and made 3 tackles.

As a sophomore, he appeared in 14 games, registering 99 tackles (12 for loss), 6 sacks, 4 quarterback hurries, 5 pass breakups and one forced fumble. He had 10 tackles (one for loss) against Navy. He started against the University at Buffalo, making 12 tackles and 2 passes defensed. He had 6 tackles, one sack, one quarterback hurry and 2 pass breakups against Old Dominion University. He made 10 tackles (one for loss) against Louisiana Tech University. He had  8 tackles, 3 sacks and one forced fumble against Florida International University.
 
As a junior, he appeared in 12 games, collecting 86 tackles (5.5 for loss), one sack, 4 interceptions, 2 quarterback hurries, one pass breakup and one fumble recovery. He had 9 tackles against University of Oklahoma. He made 16 (one for loss) and one interception against Air Force. He had 9 tackles, one sack and one quarterback hurry against No. 16 ranked University of Central Florida. He made 12 tackles (0.5 for loss) and one quarterback hurry against Marshall University.

As a senior, he appeared in 14 games, posting 109 tackles (11.5 for loss), 3.5 sacks,  4 quarterback hurries, 3 interceptions, 2 pass breakups, one forced fumble and 5 fumble recoveries (led the nation). He had 11 tackles and one fumble recovery against Ohio State University. He made 11 tackles, one fumble recovery (returned for a touchdown) and one interception against Southern Methodist University. He finished his college career with 51 games, 316 tackles (31 for loss), 11.5 sacks, 7 interceptions, 8 pass breakups and 2 forced fumbles.

Professional career

Chicago Bears
Smith was signed as an undrafted free agent by the Chicago Bears after the 2020 NFL Draft on April 27. He was waived during final roster cuts on September 5, 2020, and signed to the practice squad the next day.

Dallas Cowboys
On September 15, 2020, the Dallas Cowboys signed Smith off the Bears' practice squad. He was declared inactive in the 6 games he spent on the active roster. He was waived on October 26.

Philadelphia Eagles
On November 2, 2020, Smith was signed to the Philadelphia Eagles' practice squad. He was elevated to the active roster on December 12 for the team's week 14 game against the New Orleans Saints, and reverted to the practice squad after the game. He was promoted to the active roster on January 1, 2021. He was waived on August 29, 2021.

San Francisco 49ers
On September 3, 2021, Smith was signed to the San Francisco 49ers practice squad. He was released on September 10, 2021.

Chicago Bears (second stint)
On September 23, 2021, Smith was signed to the Chicago Bears practice squad. He was released on October 5. He was re-signed to the practice squad on October 13. He was released again on December 7.

Atlanta Falcons
On December 14, 2021, Smith was signed to the Atlanta Falcons practice squad. He signed a reserve/future contract with the Falcons on January 10, 2022. He was released on August 16, 2022.

Birmingham Stallions
Smith signed with the Birmingham Stallions of the USFL on November 3, 2022.

References

External links
 Florida Atlantic Owls bio

Living people
1997 births
African-American players of American football
Sportspeople from Miami-Dade County, Florida
Players of American football from Florida
American football linebackers
Florida Atlantic Owls football players
Chicago Bears players
Dallas Cowboys players
Philadelphia Eagles players
San Francisco 49ers players
Atlanta Falcons players
21st-century African-American sportspeople
Birmingham Stallions (2022) players